The Torre Diana ("Diana Tower") is a 33-story,  skyscraper at Río Lerma street #232, at the corner of Río Misisipí, just off the city's iconic boulevard, Paseo de la Reforma in the Colonia Cuauhtémoc neighborhood near the Diana the Huntress fountain.

References

External links
 Official website

Paseo de la Reforma
Skyscrapers in Mexico City